Edmund George McGilton (February 10, 1858 – August 31, 1933) was a Nebraska politician and lawyer who served as the 11th lieutenant governor from 1903 to 1907 under Governor John H. Mickey.

McGilton was born on February 10, 1858, in Eau Galle, Wisconsin.  He graduated from Menomonie High School and the University of Wisconsin, where he also obtained a law degree in 1885.  He served for a time as the Superintendent of Schools in Menomonie and then joined the legal department of the Wisconsin Central Railroad Company.  In 1888, he moved to Omaha, Nebraska, and was active in the Republican Party.  He served two terms as lieutenant governor (1903–05 and 1905–07) while John H. Mickey was governor.  He practiced law in Omaha after that time, and was elected president of the Commercial Law League of America in 1916.

McGilton died on August 31, 1933.

References

1858 births
1933 deaths
Lieutenant Governors of Nebraska
Nebraska Republicans
People from Dunn County, Wisconsin
Politicians from Omaha, Nebraska
University of Wisconsin–Madison alumni
Wisconsin lawyers
Nebraska lawyers
20th-century American politicians